Ramesh Rijal is a Nepalese politician, belonging to the Nepali Congress currently serving as the member of the 2nd Federal Parliament of Nepal. In the 2022 Nepalese general election, he won the election from Parsa 4 (constituency).

References

Living people
Nepal MPs 2022–present
Nepali Congress politicians from Madhesh Province
Members of the 1st Nepalese Constituent Assembly
Nepal MPs 1994–1999
Nepal MPs 1991–1994
1957 births